Pat Kearney may refer to:
 Bernard W. Kearney (1889–1976), known as Pat, U.S. Representative from New York
 Pat Kearney (broadcaster) (1955–2014), American broadcaster